Bolovan may refer to the following rivers in Romania:

 Bolovan, a tributary of the Ilva in Bistrița-Năsăud County
 Bolovan, a tributary of the Budac in Bistrița-Năsăud County
 Bolovan, a tributary of the Geamăna in Olt and Vâlcea Counties

See also 
 Bolovăniș (disambiguation)
 Bolovani, a village in Dâmbovița County, Romania